Breitensteinia insignis is a species of catfish of the family Akysidae. A detailed discussion of this species's relationship with the other species in the genus can be found at Breitensteinia.

References 

Akysidae
Freshwater fish of Indonesia
Fish described in 1881